"Private Idaho" is a single released by The B-52's from their 1980 album Wild Planet.

Composition
The B-52's are from Athens, Georgia, and never played a concert in Idaho until September 13, 2011, when they played at Eagle River Pavilion in Eagle, Idaho. In preparation of the event, the Idaho Statesman interviewed Fred Schneider about the song's meaning. "Idaho is pretty mysterious to all of us," he said. "I know it's a beautiful state, but then I know there's also a lot of crazy right-wingers and all that stuff. ...The song's about all different things. It's not like a parody of Idaho or anything."

Reception
Cash Box called it "a contagious rock dancer" with a "rumbling big beat and surf guitar, with alien vocals." Record World called it a "catchy dance-rocker."

Chart history
The single was their second Billboard Hot 100 chart entry, at #74. The single also peaked at #5 on the US Hot Dance Club Play, along with previous single "Give Me Back My Man" and "Party out of Bounds", both from Wild Planet.
"Private Idaho" reached number 11 in Australia. It was the 83rd-biggest Australian hit of 1980.

Weekly charts

Year-end charts

Popular culture
Gus Van Sant heard the song while visiting Idaho in the early 1980s, and later used the song title for his 1991 movie, My Own Private Idaho.
The song featured in the Adam Sandler movie The Wedding Singer (1998)
It is also heard in Noah Hawley's directorial debut Lucy in the Sky (2019).
The ECHL's Idaho Steelheads used the song as their rink entrance/warmup song through the 2005-2006 hockey season.

References

1980 songs
1980 singles
The B-52's songs
Songs written by Fred Schneider
Songs written by Kate Pierson
Songs written by Keith Strickland
Songs written by Cindy Wilson
Warner Records singles
Works about Idaho